Kreis Schubin was one of many Kreise (counties) in the northern administrative region of Bromberg, in the Prussian province of Posen, from 1815-1919. Its capital was Schubin (Szubin).

History

Kreis Schubin (1815-1919) was a Kreis (county) in the northern administrative region of Bromberg, in the Prussian province of Posen. The territory was created as part of the Grand Duchy of Posen (1815-1848, in personal union with Prussia) and later was part of the Prussian Province of Posen (1848-1919). On January 18, 1871, Kreis Schubin, along with all of Prussia, became part of Germany. The county's territory was reduced significantly in 1887 when the southern half of Kreis Schubin was used to create the new Kreis Znin.

Kreis Schubin was part of the military command (German: Bezirkskommando) at Hohensalza. The main court (German: Landgericht) was in Bromberg, with lower courts (German: Amtsgericht) in Schubin, Exin, and Labischin.

The Kreis was dissolved in 1919 when the territory became part of the Second Polish Republic. During World War II, the territory of the former Kreis became Landkreis Altburgund in Reichsgau Wartheland from 1939 to 1945.

Demographics

Geographical features

Table of Standesämter 
"Standesamt" is the German name of the local civil registration offices which were established in October 1874 soon after the German Empire was formed. Births, marriages and deaths were recorded. Previously, only duplicate copies of church records were used. By 1905, Kreis Schubin had the following 14 offices for rural residents:

Tur district was created in 1884 from parts of Netzwalde and Schubin districts. In addition, the following cities were separate districts for urban residents: Bartschin, Exin, Labischin, Schubin.

Table of all communities

References

External links
 List of genealogical records
 Facsimiles of registration books

Navigation Bar 

This article is part of the project Wikipedia:WikiProject Prussian Kreise. Please refer to the project page, before making changes.

Districts of the Province of Posen
1871 establishments in Germany
1919 disestablishments in Germany
Districts of Prussia